Raoul I of Lusignan (born c. 1160/5 – Melle, 1 May 1219) was the second son of Hugh de Lusignan (d. 1169) and the grandson of Hugh VIII of Lusignan. He was a prominent nobleman in the region of Poitou, and lord (seigneur) d'Exoudun, de Melle, de Chizé, de Civray and de La Mothe. He also became Count of Eu (c. 1191), by marriage (de jure uxoris) to Alix d'Eu. Since the region of Poitou was contested between kings of France and England, local nobility was often changing sides. Up to 1201, Raoul was loyal to kings of England, but than changed his allegiance to king of France. He later rejoined the English side, and took part in the Battle of Bouvines (1214). For his services to the king England, he was granted possession of Hastings and Tickhill, in 1216. Earlier, he participated, as a young knight, in the Third Crusade, and later again in the Fifth Crusade, and died upon return. He was buried at the Priory of Fontblanche, in Exoudun.

Family 
By 1191, Raoul married a young noblewoman Alix d'Eu, heiress of the County of Eu (born c. 1180 – La Mothe-Saint-Heray, Poitou, May 1246). 

They had several children, including:

 Raoul II de Lusignan, Count of Eu (c. 1200 – 1246)
 Matilda de Lusignan (c. 1210 – 14 August 1241), who married Humphrey de Bohun, 2nd Earl of Hereford, 1st Earl of Essex and Constable of England. She was buried at Llanthony, Gloucester. They were ancestors to Queen Catherine Parr.

As lord of Exoudun, he is known as: Raoul d'Exoudun, and should not be confused with a contemporary nobleman, Raoul of Issoudun (Raoul d'Issoudun), who was married to Margaret of Courtenay.

See also 
 French invasion of Normandy (1202–1204)
 Anglo-French War (1213–1214)

References

Sources

External links 
 Foundation for Medieval Genealogy: Raoul de Lusignan

House of Lusignan
Counts of Eu
Christians of the Third Crusade
Christians of the Fifth Crusade
1160s births
1219 deaths